87 (eighty-seven) is the natural number following 86 and preceding 88.

In mathematics
87 is:

 the sum of the squares of the first four primes (87 = 22 + 32 + 52 + 72).
 the sum of the sums of the divisors of the first 10 positive integers.
 the thirtieth semiprime, and the twenty-sixth distinct semiprime and the eighth of the form (3.q).
 5! - 4! - 3! - 2! - 1! = 87
 the last two decimal digits of Graham's number.

In sports
 Cricket in Australia holds 87 as a superstitiously unlucky score and is referred to as "the devil's number". This originates from the fact that 87 is 13 runs short of a century. 187, 287, and so on are also considered unlucky but are not as common as 87 on its own.
 In the National Hockey League, Wayne Gretzky scored a league-high 87 goals with the Edmonton Oilers in the 1983–84 NHL season.

In other fields
Eighty-seven is also:

The atomic number of francium.
An answer to a popular puzzle question states 16, 06, 68, 88, xx, 98. The answer is 87 when looked upside down.
The number of years between the signing of the U.S. Declaration of Independence and the Battle of Gettysburg, immortalized in Abraham Lincoln's Gettysburg Address with the phrase "Four Score and Seven Years ago..."
The model number of Junkers Ju 87.
The number of the French department Haute-Vienne.
The code for international direct dial phone calls to Inmarsat and other services.
The 87 photographic filter blocks visible light allowing only infrared light to pass.
The ISBN Group Identifier for books published in Denmark.
The opus number of the 24 Preludes and Fugues of Dmitri Shostakovich.
In model railroading, the ratio of the popular H0 scale is 1:87. Proto:87 scale claims to offer precise proportions of wheels and tracks of real railroads.
David Bowie CD (1987) Never Let Me Down includes the song, "'87 and Cry".
The 87th United States Congress met from January 3, 1961 to January 3, 1963, during John F. Kennedy's time in office.
Ed McBain's 87th Precinct: Lightning film starred Randy Quaid (1995).
87 punch includes one bottle of Bacardi rum (eight years aged) and 7-up (two-liter bottle).
Wenger Swiss Army Knife version XXL, listed in the Guinness Book of World Records as the world's most multi-functional penknife with 87 tools.
Sonnet 87 by William Shakespeare.
Vault 87 is a main location in the game Fallout 3.
M87* is the first black hole ever photographed.
Aragorn's age in The Lord of the Rings.
"The Bite of '87" in the Five Nights at Freddy's series.

See also 
 List of highways numbered 87

References

Integers